PT Solo Manufaktur Kreasi, trading as Esemka, is an Indonesian automotive company based in Solo, Indonesia. The "Esemka" brand was named as the abbreviation of vocational high school (Indonesian: SMK/Sekolah Menengah Kejuruan) to recognize the effort of the students to develop the native car brand. Though initially local media used to term it as national car brand of Indonesia, but the company described Esemka as a vehicle which is totally made in Indonesia. Since 2013 an average of 10 units of SUV and mini trucks had been manufactured per month by the company. The company started commercial production of various model of cars and minivan in its manufacturing plant at Demangan village, Boyolali Regency in Central Java since 2016.  It was officially inaugurated by Indonesian President Joko Widodo on 6 September 2019. At the time of inauguration, the manufacturing plant has production capacity of 12,000 vehicles per year. Esemka uses locally made components from companies such as PT INKA and Pertamina.

History 

For a long time local companies in Indonesia have tried to design their own cars but failed to manufacture those in mass production. Besides Esemka, few other local made cars got publicity in the past, which include Gea by state-owned train manufacturer PT Industri Kereta Api (Inka), Tawon of PT Super Gasindo Jaya, and Fin Komodo of PT Fin Komodo Technology. A company PT Kiat Mahesa Wintor Indonesia (KMWI) has been commercially manufacturing a rural vehicle named as Mahesa since 2018.

Journey of Esemka involved a number of Indonesian vocational high schools (Sekolah Menengah Kejuruan or SMK). Kiat Esemka was the first Esemka car, which was made in 2011 by students of SMK 1 Trucuk, a state-run vocational high school in Klaten, Central Java. The car got wide publicity when Joko Widodo started to use as official vehicle as Mayor of Solo during that time.
2007 - SMK Indonesia Partnering AIK (Autocar Indutri Components) designs and manufactures 1500 cc car engine components;
2008 - SMK Indonesia and AIK continue the engine component manufacturing program;
2009 - SMK partnered with PT Nasional Motor to make a double cabin body and with PT Mageda to build an SUV body and was approved by President Susilo Bambang Yudhoyono at an exhibition at ITB Bandung;
2010 - Partnering with Foday, Jinbei, and SMEs in Indonesia to develop SUVs and product test minitruck at the Indonesia International Manufacturing (IIM 2010) exhibition received enthusiastic greetings from the public, jointly establishing PT Solo Manufacturing Kreasi as well as being the holder of the Esemka brand;
2011 - PT Solo Manufaktur Kreasi takes care of production permits (Kemenperin) and road worthiness (Kemenhub and BTMP) according to Government Regulations so that they are commercially viable;
2012 - PT Solo Manufaktur Kreasi releases Variant Rajawali R2 and Bima 1.1 and collaborates with several foreign component manufacturers and SMEs in Indonesia to develop variants;
2013 - PT Solo Manufaktur Kreasi successfully released several units from the Esemka Rajawali variant for learning and operational media;
2014 - Esemka designed rural transport cars, mass public transport and also several high-passenger transport (Minibus and Minitruck). Handed over 40 Esemka SUVs and pick ups, which were the first production lot and were all produced at an SMK in Tangerang, Banten;
2015 - Esemka made prototypes of Digdaya 2.7 D, Bima 1.3, Bima 1.8D, Esemka Niaga 1.0;
2016 - Esemka builds the first assembly plan at Demangan village, Boyolali Regency in Central Java;
2019 - President Joko Widodo officially opened the Esemka Factory in Boyolali Regency, Central Java and launched the Bima;
2023 - Esemka joined the Indonesia International Motor Show for the first time and launched the Bima EV. The exhibition was visited by president Joko Widodo at its opening.

Models

Prototype models 
 Esemka Hatchback — hatchback (2009)
 Esemka Rosa Van — cab over van (2009)
 Esemka Digdaya — pickup truck (2009, 2011, 2017)
 Esemka Zhangaro — cab over pickup truck (2009)
 Esemka Rajawali — SUV (2011)
 Esemka Rajawali R2 — crossover SUV, based on Chery Tiggo (2012, 2014)
 Esemka Patua — semi-cab over pickup truck, based on DFSK K05/K07 (2012)
 Esemka Bima 1.1 — semi-cab over pickup truck, based on Karry Youjin (2012)
 Esemka Garuda 1 — SUV, based on Foday Landfort (2017)
 Esemka Borneo — semi-cab over van (2017)

Mass-production models 
So far the following models are currently being manufactured by the company:
 Esemka Bima 1.2/1.3/EV — semi-cab over pickup truck, based on Chana Star 5, Jinbei/Shineray T30, and Shineray X30L EV (2019–present)

See also 

 Automotive industry in Indonesia

References

External links 

 

Indonesian brands
Car brands
Car models
Car manufacturers of Indonesia
Vehicle manufacturing companies established in 2007
Indonesian companies established in 2007